George Vincent "Gigi" Kenneally, Sr (April 12, 1902 – September 3, 1968) was an American football offensive lineman in the National Football League for the Pottsville Maroons, the Boston Bulldogs, the Chicago Cardinals, the Boston Braves, and the Philadelphia Eagles.  He attended St. Bonaventure University.

Early life
Kenneally began his athletic career at Boston Latin High School where he played varsity football, baseball, and held the city record for the fifty-yard dash.  Upon graduating in 1919 he joined a group of local youths who were forming a semi-pro football team to play out of the local Knights of Columbus.  He then followed his older brother and enrolled at St. Bonaventure, where in 1922, he began his collegiate career.  During his four years there he was given sixteen varsity letters, including ones for boxing, as well as being the captain of the football team.

Professional career

Pottsville Maroons/Boston Bulldogs
Kenneally joined the NFL in 1926 with the Pottsville Maroons of Pottsville, Pennsylvania.  After his rookie season, he was chosen as the team's captain and was also named to his first All-Pro Squad in 1927, as well as in 1928.  At the close of the 1928 season the team succumbed to financial difficulties and was no longer solvent.  He, along with his partner, then decided to purchase the Maroons franchise for $2,500.  Kenneally then transferred the team to Boston where they became the Boston Bulldogs.  Kenneally had many positions in the franchise; that of part owner, assistant Coach, team captain and offensive end.  The Bulldogs were a competitive team and would finish the season at 4-4, but the Wall Street Crash of 1929 caused the team to fold.

Chicago Cardinals
Kenneally was back in the NFL in 1930, playing for the Chicago Cardinals.  This season would prove to be one of his best in the league as he helped guide the struggling franchise to a 5-6 record, but also his only season for Chicago.  The highlight of the season was an indoor exhibition game played at Chicago Stadium between the Chicago Bears and Cardinals with the proceeds aiding unemployment relief funds.

Boston University
In 1931, Kenneally accepted a coaching position at Boston University.  He also utilized this sabbatical year by unsuccessfully trying to generate funds to restart his Bulldog franchise.  He would lead the Marquette's to an undefeated season with a schedule that consisted of two professional opponents.  They outscored their opponents that season 236 to 9.

Boston Braves
In 1932, Kenneally returned to Boston to play/coach for George Preston Marshall's Boston Braves.  He played for the Braves for only one season as an offensive end and an assistant coach.

Philadelphia Eagles
In 1933, Kenneally left Boston with Lud Wray to play for and assist with the newly formed Philadelphia Eagles franchise.  For the next three seasons, he would anchor the Eagles line, serve as the team's captain and assistant coach, and was again selected All-Pro during the 1934 season.  He retired at the end of the 1935 season.

After football

Boston Shamrocks
Kenneally was offered the position of head coach and General Manager of the Boston Shamrocks of the newly formed American Football League.  The Shamrocks would play a 19-game schedule which resulted in them capturing the league title as AFL champions for the 1936 season.  However, the AFL was financially unstable and was soon forced to cease operations.  The Shamrocks would continue to operate as an independent until 1938.

Later years
In 1939, Kenneally accepted the position of athletic director, head coach, and history teacher at Revere High School.  In 1950, he left the Revere athletic program in a vastly improved state and became the line coach at Brandeis University for four years.  He then returned to his old job as head of the Social Studies department at Revere, the position he would hold until his death.

Kenneally died on September 3, 1968. He was survived by his five children, including state legislator George V. Kenneally Jr.

Legacy
In the 1950s, Reader's Digest published an article entitled "George Kenneally the toughest two-way end to ever play for the Philadelphia Eagles."
In 1951, he was elected to the New England Sports Hall of Fame as a charter member.
In 1970, he was inducted into the Pennsylvania Sports Hall of Fame.
In 1973, he was inducted into the Brandeis University Hall of Fame
In 1976, he was inducted into the Saint Bonaventure Hall Of Fame.
In 1990, he was inducted into the Massachusetts High School Coaches Hall of Fame and the South Boston Hall of Fame.

References

1902 births
1968 deaths
American football offensive linemen
Boston Braves (NFL) players
Boston Bulldogs (NFL) players
Boston University Terriers football coaches
Brandeis Judges football coaches
Chicago Cardinals players
High school football coaches in Massachusetts
National Football League owners
People from South Boston
Pottsville Maroons players
Philadelphia Eagles coaches
Philadelphia Eagles players
St. Bonaventure Brown Indians football players
Players of American football from Boston